Lophiotoma koolhoveni is a species of sea snail, a marine gastropod mollusk in the family Turridae, the turrids.

Description
The length of the shell varies between 17.8 mm and 42.5 mm.

Distribution
This marine species occurs off Java, Indonesia; in the South China Sea. Fossils were found in Pliocene strata in Bantam, Java.

References

 Oostingh, C. H. "Mollusken als gidsfossielen voor het Neogeen in Nederlandsch-Indië." Handelingen van het achste Nederlandsch-Indisch Natuurwetenschap-pelijk Congres gehouden te, Soerabaja van. 1938.
 Oostingh, C. H. Die Mollusken des Pliocäns von Süd-Bantam in Java. Afdeeling Geologie van den Dienst van den Mijnbouw, 1938.
 Liu, J.Y. [Ruiyu] (ed.). (2008). Checklist of marine biota of China seas. China Science Press. 1267 pp.

koolhoveni
Gastropods described in 1938